Eremina is a genus of land snails.

Species include:

 Eremina desertorum (Forskål, 1775)
 Eremina ehrenbergi (Roth, 1839)

References 

Helicidae